The tenth and final season of Beverly Hills, 90210, is an American drama television series aired from September 8, 1999 on Fox and concluded on May 17, 2000, after 27 episodes. The season aired on Wednesday nights at 8/7c in the United States averaging 8.33 million viewers a week. It was released to DVD in 2011. Initial plans for an eleventh season were to be developed but due to low ratings and high associated costs with production the show ended at its tenth season.

Synopsis
For nine years, the West Bev gang mature from high school students to college graduates on their own for the first time. While their lives have begun to diverge and new people have entered their lives, they have always kept close relationships with one another. This season promises to be an unforgettable year of marriages, children, and career decisions for a group of friends who have maintained the bonds that have sustained them as they evolved from teenagers to young adults.

Cast

Starring
 Jennie Garth as Kelly Taylor 
 Ian Ziering as Steve Sanders 
 Brian Austin Green as David Silver 
 Tori Spelling as Donna Martin
 Vincent Young as Noah Hunter  
 Vanessa Marcil as Gina Kincaid (episodes 1-17)
 Lindsay Price as Janet Sosna  
 Daniel Cosgrove as Matt Durning  
 Joe E. Tata as Nat Bussichio (episodes 1-13, 21-27)

Special guest star
Luke Perry as Dylan McKay

Recurring
 Jed Allan as Rush Sanders 
 Matthew Laurance as Mel Silver 
 Ann Gillespie as Jackie Taylor 
 Michael Durrell as John Martin 
 Denise Dowse as Vice Principal Yvonne Teasley 
 Katherine Cannon as Felice Martin 
 Josie Davis as Camille Desmond 
 Josh Taylor as Jack McKay

Notable guest stars
Gabrielle Carteris as Andrea Zuckerman 
Tiffani Thiessen as Valerie Malone 
Jason Priestley as Brandon Walsh

Episodes

Source:

References

1999 American television seasons
2000 American television seasons
Beverly Hills, 90210 seasons